Mount Carmel College is the name of:

Mount Carmel College, Bangalore, India, a women's college
Mount Carmel College, Rosewater, South Australia, Australia, a Catholic secondary school
Mount Carmel College, Sandy Bay, Tasmania, Australia, a Catholic school from kindergarten to Year 2 (for boys) and Year 10 (for girls)

See also
Mount Carmel Catholic College for Girls, in London
Mount Carmel High School (disambiguation)
 Mount Carmel (disambiguation)